Raj Tilak may refer to:
 Raaj Tilak, a 1984 Hindi film starring Raaj Kumar, Sunil Dutt, Dharmendra, Kamal Haasan and Hema Malini
 Raj Tilak (1958 film), a Hindi film starring, Gemini Ganesan, Padmini and Vyjayanthimala
 Raj Joshi Tilak, Indian Olympic sprinter
 Raj Tilak (director), Hindi film director whose work includes directing Mukti
 Raj Tilak (ichthyologist)

Tilak, Raj